Mustafa Destici (born 1966 in Eskişehir) is a Turkish politician and the current leader of the Great Union Party (BBP). He graduated from Ankara University.

References

1966 births
Living people
Great Unity Party politicians
Ankara University alumni